Nasopharyngeal angiofibroma is an angiofibroma also known as juvenile nasal angiofibroma, fibromatous hamartoma, and angiofibromatous hamartoma of the nasal cavity. It is a histologically benign but locally aggressive vascular tumor of the nasopharynx that  arises from the superior margin of the sphenopalatine foramen and grows in the back of the nasal cavity. It most commonly affects adolescent males (because it is a hormone-sensitive tumor).
Though it is a benign tumor, it is locally invasive and can invade the nose, cheek, orbit (frog face deformity), or brain. Patients with nasopharyngeal angiofibroma usually present with one-sided nasal obstruction with profuse epistaxis.

Signs and symptoms
 Frequent chronic epistaxis or blood-tinged nasal discharge
 Nasal obstruction and rhinorrhea
 Facial dysmorphism (when locally invasive)
 Conductive hearing loss from eustachian-tube obstruction
 Diplopia, which occurs secondary to erosion into superior orbital fissure and due to third and sixth nerve palsy.
 Proptosis when having intraorbital extension.
 Rarely anosmia, recurrent otitis media, and eye pain.

Diagnosis

If nasopharyngeal angiofibroma is suspected based on physical examination (a smooth vascular submucosal mass in the posterior nasal cavity of an adolescent male), imaging studies such as CT or MRI should be performed. Biopsy should be avoided as to avoid extensive bleeding since the tumor is composed of blood vessels without a muscular coat.

Antral sign or Holman-Miller sign (forward bowing of posterior wall of maxilla) is pathognomic of angiofibroma.

DSA (digital subtraction angiography)  of carotid artery to see the extension of tumors and feeding vessels

Differential diagnosis
 Antro-choanal polyp (benign non neoplastic growth)
 Rhinosporidiosis (as bleeding point is here too)
 Malignancy—nasopharyngeal carcinoma, lymphoma, plasmacytoma, rhabdomyosarcoma
 Chordoma
 Nasopharyngeal cyst
 Pyogenic granuloma

Staging 
There are many different staging- systems published. One of the most used is that of Radkowsky:

Treatment
Treatment for Nasopharyngeal angiofibroma (JNA) is primarily surgical. The tumor is primarily excised by external or endoscopic approach. Medical treatment and radiation therapy are only of historical interest.

External approaches:
 transpalatine approach
 transpalatine + sublabial (Sardana's) Approach
 infratemporal Approach
 nasal endoscopic Approach
 transmaxillary Approach
 maxillary swing Approach or Facial translocation

Endoscopic approach  is an excellent tool in primary and recurrent JNA, it allows visualisation and precise removal of the lesion. Preoperative embolisation of tumour may be of some use in reducing intraoperative bleeding.

Direct visualization is not common-

 If the tumor is limited to nasopharynx and nose, for endoscopic approach or Wilson's transpalatal approach is used. It can be extended into Sardana's approach if the tumor extends laterally.
 For tumors of infratemporal fossa, Maxillary Swing approach is used.
 Transmaxillary Le Fort 1 approach is used for tumors extending into maxillary and ethmoid sinuses and pterygopalatine fossa.
 If the tumor extend up to the cheek, for Weber–Ferguson approach should be used.

Prognosis
Prognosis for nasopharyngeal angiofibroma is favorable. Because these tumors are benign, metastasis to distal sites does not occur. However, these tumors are highly vascularized and grow rapidly. Removal is important in preventing nasal obstruction and recurrent epistaxis. Mortality is not associated with nasopharyngeal angiofibroma.

References

External links 

Tumour of the respiratory system